Nikoloz "Nika" Chkheidze (born 29 November 1968) is a former Soviet and Georgian footballer who played as goalkeeper. Chkheidze played once for Georgia in a friendly match against Moldova in 1991.

He had a three-seasons spell with FC 08 Homburg after the club was relegated from 2. Fußball-Bundesliga to Regionalliga West/Südwest. He left Homburg after a financial crisis that led the team to bankruptcy and denial of license even to play at Oberliga Südwest, the 4th national level.

Honours
 Georgian League: 5
1991, 1992, 1993, 1994, 1995
 Georgian Cup: 4
1992, 1993, 1994, 1995

References

Soviet footballers
Footballers from Georgia (country)
Expatriate footballers from Georgia (country)
Georgia (country) international footballers
FC Torpedo Kutaisi players
FC Dinamo Tbilisi players
Erovnuli Liga players
Expatriate footballers in Germany
Association football goalkeepers
1968 births
Living people